Jacques Rougerie (5 January 1932 – 22 March 2022) was a French historian of the Paris Commune.

Works 
 Procès des communards (1964)
 Paris libre 1871 (1971)
 1871: Jalons pour une histoire de la Commune de Paris (1973)
 La Commune (1988)
 Eugène Varlin: Aux origines du mouvement ouvrier (2019)

See also 
 Besançon Commune
 Dictionnaire biographique du mouvement ouvrier français
 Histoire de la Commune de 1871
 Prosper-Olivier Lissagaray
 Jean Maitron
 Robert Tombs

References

External links 
 

1932 births
2022 deaths
Historians of France
20th-century French historians
Labor historians
École Normale Supérieure alumni
Academic staff of Pantheon-Sorbonne University
Paris Commune